The Rhodesian government actively recruited white personnel from other countries from the mid-1970s to address manpower shortages in the Rhodesian Security Forces during the Rhodesian Bush War. It is estimated that between 800 and 2,000 foreign volunteers enlisted, with the exact number not being known. They generally served alongside Rhodesian personnel in a large number of units, though a group of Frenchmen served together in a separate unit.

The volunteers had a range of motivations. The most common motivation was opposition to governments led by black people, but other volunteers were motivated by anti-communism or a desire for adventure. They generally joined the Rhodesian Security Forces individually after seeing advertisements or after being contacted by recruiters. The volunteers frequently received a hostile response from Rhodesians in the units they were posted to, and many ended their contracts early as a result.

In many countries it was illegal to serve with the Rhodesian Security Forces. The British, United States and several other governments were unable to prevent their citizens fighting for Rhodesia due to difficulties enforcing the relevant laws. The volunteers were often labelled as mercenaries by opponents of the Rhodesian regime, though the Rhodesian government did not regard or pay them as such.

Background

Political situation

Southern Rhodesia was a self-governing British colony located in southern Africa whose economy and government was dominated by the small white minority of its population. From 1962 its government was led by the Rhodesian Front political party. The party was deeply committed to maintaining the white minority's status, with this motivating a decision to declare independence from the United Kingdom rather than submit to a transition to majority rule. Accordingly, the government issued Rhodesia's Unilateral Declaration of Independence (UDI) from the United Kingdom in November 1965, with the colony becoming Rhodesia. UDI was illegal under British law, and was regarded as such by almost all other countries and the United Nations. Britain and the United Nations Security Council imposed wide-ranging trade and other sanctions on Rhodesia with the objective of forcing it to return to its previous status. The scope of these sanctions was increased over time, and included restrictions on support for its military. No country ever officially recognised Rhodesia's independence. South Africa and Portugal provided Rhodesia with assistance, and it was able to evade the sanctions and covertly trade with many countries.

The Rhodesian Front's ideology held that the end of colonial rule in Africa and the development of African nationalism during the 1950s and 1960s had been the result of international communism aided by a policy of appeasement towards African nationalists by the United Kingdom and other western countries. The party believed that Rhodesia needed to take a stand against the perceived communist threat to protect western civilisation in Africa. The academic Michael Evans has written that "the Front’s world-struggle ideology was based on a conspiratorial interpretation of modern politics that emphasised virulent forms of Anglophobia, anti-communism, anti-internationalism, and anti-liberalism". He also noted that the party drew on the ideas and language used by the contemporary radical right movement in the United States to justify UDI. The historian Donal Lowry has endorsed Evans' views, noting also that "the Rhodesia Front sought to combine the notion that Rhodesia embodied the best of true Britishness, the notion that white Rhodesians were ‘the sort of people who once made the “Great" of Britain’, while turning to America as the only remaining champion of the ‘Free World’. It took pains to not be seen as racially or politically extreme, and the party's rhetoric was focused on the need to combat the perceived communist threat rather than the goal of sustaining racial superiority. This ideology attracted support from many mainstream conservative politicians and military veterans in the United Kingdom and United States, as well as from some far right groups in those countries.

Rhodesian Bush War
UDI and Rhodesia's racial inequalities led to the outbreak of the Rhodesian Bush War. The resistance to the Rhodesian regime was dominated by two black nationalist movements, the Zimbabwe African National Union (ZANU) and the Zimbabwe African People's Union (ZAPU). The ZANU was supported by China and the ZAPU by the Soviet Union, both of which were communist countries. The two movements espoused Marxist beliefs and were regarded as communists by the Rhodesian government. However, they and their guerrilla armies were motivated mainly by nationalism and a desire to end discriminatory practices and establish majority rule in Rhodesia.

Guerrilla activities began in 1966, and mainly involved small groups operating in northern Rhodesia. Until the early 1970s the Rhodesian Security Forces had little difficulty in defeating the guerrillas. Rhodesia's security situation deteriorated during the mid-1970s when the nationalists were able to establish bases in Mozambique as Portuguese rule faltered and finally ended in 1975. This led to a rapid growth in the insurgency which the security forces were unable to contain. The Rhodesians' brutal counterinsurgency tactics also proved counter-productive. By 1979 the Rhodesian government was facing defeat and the war was costing 2,000 lives each month. This led to a negotiated conclusion to the war that involved a transition to majority rule and the establishment of Zimbabwe in 1980.

Foreigners with far right beliefs were often sympathetic to the Rhodesian cause during the war. This was because they believed that it was being fought to sustain white rule and prevent communists from taking over the country.

Rhodesian Security Forces

The Rhodesian Security Forces were considerably expanded over the war. At the time of UDI, the Rhodesian Army had a strength of over 18,400, including 15,000 reservists, the Rhodesian Air Force had a small but modern fleet of combat aircraft and the paramilitary British South Africa Police included 7,000 full time and 25,000 reserve personnel. The Army's structure of administrative corps was similar to that of the British Army, and many of its officers had undergone training in the United Kingdom. As the war continued, additional army and police units were raised and the periods of active service reservists were required to undertake was increased. In April 1979, 60,000 members of the military and police were on active duty to protect that month's Rhodesian general election.

While most of the security forces' personnel were black, the Rhodesian government had a strong preference for whites. The army units manned by full time personnel, which included a high proportion of white regular and conscripted soldiers, were the most powerful element of the security forces and formed a strategic reserve that responded to the guerrilla activities.

The expansion of the security forces, increasing battle casualties and a decline in the white population due to high rates of emigration led to serious shortages of white personnel that greatly hindered the Rhodesian war effort. The Rhodesian government attempted several strategies to address these shortages. It sought to attract more white immigrants to the country, but from 1973 onwards the white population decreased. The number of white conscripts in the security forces was also increased by considerably expanding the age groups of men who were required to serve and the periods of active duty reservists needed to undertake.

Recruitment

Another strategy used to address white manpower shortages was seeking white volunteers from outside the country, which the Rhodesian government began doing in 1973. Men with previous military experience, and especially service in wars, were preferred. It was expected that most of the volunteers for the security forces would not settle in Rhodesia.

From the mid-1970s the Rhodesian government began placing advertisements seeking volunteers in the international media. Due to the sanctions against Rhodesia, these ads were generally lodged via front organisations and were vague about the country the volunteers would serve in. The Rhodesian government openly advertised in the American Soldier of Fortune magazine during 1975. This magazine had been established that year to promote mercenary opportunities, and provided a positive portrayal of the lifestyle available to mercenaries. Its editor was a strong supporter of the white Rhodesian cause and wanted to encourage Americans to fight for Rhodesia. Advertisements were also placed in other American magazines, including Shotgun News and Shooting Times. Some ads described service in Rhodesia as "fun". The ads and other coverage of Rhodesia in Soldier of Fortune led to a "steady stream of volunteers".

The Rhodesian Security Forces' recruitment staff responded to people who wrote letters of inquiry after reading the advertisements. These letters were closely scrutinised, as many of the men who had written them were considered "obviously nuts" by the Rhodesian Army's recruitment officer Major Nick Lamprecht. Those who were considered potentially suitable were sent information packs, and asked to supply documentation to support their application; preference was given to applicants who provided notarized documents in their response. Successful applicants were then offered a rank in the security forces. The Rhodesian government paid the airfares of volunteers who were unable to afford to travel until 1977. Other volunteers were expected to pay their own way.

In addition to using advertisements, Rhodesian recruitment teams, including some led by Lamprecht, visited several countries. Rhodesian officers also sought to use their networks in other militaries to attract volunteers. Organisations representing veterans were another method used to contact potential recruits. In 1976 some current and former British soldiers were sent unsolicited leaflets that encouraged them to enlist in the Rhodesian Army and explained its conditions of service. Rhodesian recruitment leaflets were also circulated within British Army barracks that year.

Several individuals and companies recruited United States citizens to fight in Rhodesia. These organisations provided recruits for the security forces as well as private industry, including farms, mines and timber companies. Some of the Americans volunteered to work as security guards on farms in Rhodesia as this offered the opportunity to fight communists while receiving higher pay than that offered by the security forces.

Most of the foreigners who volunteered to fight for Rhodesia did so individually. An exception was a group of almost 200 French military personnel who enlisted together in late 1976. Sources differ on whether these men were paratroopers or members of the French Foreign Legion. They were recruited by the Rhodesian Central Intelligence Organisation (CIO) from a French military base in Djibouti. The French troops were being withdrawn from Djibouti upon that country's independence, and French intelligence agents helped facilitate their recruitment by the Rhodesian Army. The CIO regarded this as a success, but all other elements of the Rhodesian government were sceptical. Small numbers of black ex-Flechas from Mozambique were also accepted after the end of Portuguese rule in that country; they were paid less than white soldiers.

The Rhodesian government did not accept all offers of volunteers. In 1976 former Portuguese officials offered 2,000 white soldiers who had served with the UNITA nationalist movement in Angola until that country's independence. This proposal was quickly dismissed as the Rhodesians did not see how they could arm or use large numbers of non-English speakers. A proposal by the mercenary Mike Hoare to establish an international brigade modelled on the French Foreign Legion was also rejected. In 1977 the pretender to the Albanian throne, Leka I, asked the Rhodesian government to train a battalion of Albanians that he hoped to recruit. He offered Rhodesia the services of these men after they completed training, though he intended to eventually use them to retake Albania. The Rhodesian government did not formally reply.

Volunteers' motivations
Foreign volunteers for the Rhodesian Security Forces were generally motivated by personal political and ideological beliefs or a desire for adventure. The academic Luise White has written that they were commonly opposed to the establishment of governments run by black people and did not have any particular commitment to Rhodesia itself. Many volunteers were also strongly anti-communist, and wanted to stop the further spread of this ideology in Africa. Some American volunteers were attracted by a belief that the war in Rhodesia was comparable to that which had been fought on the American frontier. As a result, White has observed that the volunteers were typically more willing to fight and even die for the ideology of the Rhodesian Front party than for Rhodesia itself. Economic factors also influenced some of the volunteers, as they believed that the Rhodesian Security Forces offered better career prospects than those available in their home country.

The Rhodesian Special Branch sought to vet all of the foreign volunteers for security risks. This proved impossible due to the large numbers and difficulty of checking their backgrounds. Some of the volunteers were later identified as agents of the United States Central Intelligence Agency. The British intelligence agencies also infiltrated agents into the Rhodesian Security Forces.

Numbers of volunteers

As historians have found it difficult to access Rhodesian records, it is not known exactly how many foreigners volunteered for the Rhodesian Security Forces. The high proportion of white Rhodesians who were born outside the country or held citizenship of another country also complicates the matter. As a result, there are a range of estimates of the numbers of foreigners who travelled to Rhodesia to serve with the security forces:
The historians Peter Godwin and Ian Hancock have written that foreign volunteers represented only a "tiny minority" of the Rhodesian military in 1972, with 90 per cent of recruits being Rhodesians and most of the remainder permanent residents of the country.
Historian Michael Raeburn put the figure in 1978 as between 1,500 and 2,000.
A British deserter from the Rhodesian military claimed in 1976 that 2,000 of the 6,000 regular soldiers in the Rhodesian Army were British and another 100 Americans.
The American journalist Robin Wright and South African journalist Paul Smurthwaite separately reported that there were 1,000 foreigners in the Rhodesian military.
The ethnographic and historical researcher Henrik Ellert has written that there were 1,500 in 1977–78.
The British Foreign and Commonwealth Office (FCO) estimated in November 1978 that there were approximately 800 foreigners serving in Rhodesia, of whom around half were British and most of the others American.
Military historians Paul L. Moorcraft and Peter McLaughlin believe the number was likely around 1,400, but have noted that estimates from other experts range as high as 2,000.
The historian Luise White noted in 2004 that "the figure most sources cite is 1,500 foreign soldiers, of whom perhaps 400 were American", though the Rhodesian Army put the number at 1,000 including 100 Americans. 
In 2021 White wrote that the numbers of foreign volunteers may have been small, and the ex-Rhodesian generals she had interviewed "scoffed at me when I asked if there were fifteen hundred foreigners in the Rhodesian Army". In this work she estimated that around 100 Americans served with the Rhodesian Security Forces between 1976 and 1980.
The academics Jacob Ware and John Campbell stated in 2022 that people from more than fifteen countries had volunteered to fight for Rhodesia, including "several hundred" Americans.

British citizens made up the majority of the foreign volunteers who served with the Rhodesian Security Forces. Most of the other volunteers were from the United States, Australia, New Zealand and Europe. Many of the Europeans had previously served with the French Foreign Legion.

In addition to the actual volunteers, thousands of South African Police and South African Defence Force (SADF) personnel were deployed to Rhodesia by the South African government to serve in or alongside the Rhodesian Security Forces. These men were often directed to wear Rhodesian uniforms, and the South African government falsely claimed that some had volunteered for the Rhodesian Security Forces. By the end of the war there were around 6,000 SADF personnel in Rhodesia.

Conditions and service
Foreign volunteers who were accepted were required to swear an oath of loyalty to Rhodesia, and the Rhodesian government considered them to be members of the security forces rather than mercenaries. They enlisted for a period of three years, which was the same as white Rhodesians who joined up on a full-time basis. The volunteers also received the same pay as white Rhodesians, between $US 4,000 and $US 7,000 annually. These pay rates were lower than those in some other armies; for instance, they were around half the levels in the United States Army and between 50 and 60 per cent of the Australian Army's pay scale. Rhodesian recruiters told prospective Australian recruits that the cost of living was much lower in Rhodesia. Foreign volunteers were also offered land if they settled in Rhodesia after completing their service with the security forces.

All foreign volunteers were required to complete basic training upon arrival in Rhodesia, even if they had prior military experience. Those who failed this training had to leave the country, with their airfare home being paid by the Rhodesian government. Foreign volunteers who openly expressed extreme racial views were deported. For instance, the American neo-Nazi Harold Covington claimed to have served in the Rhodesian Army before being deported due to his racism.

After completing training, many of the volunteers were assigned to the all-white Rhodesian Light Infantry (RLI) and particularly its 3 Commando sub-unit. In 1979, the military historian John Keegan noted that foreigners made up between a quarter and a third of the strength of the RLI. Neil Grant gave a lower figure in 2015, stating that over 10 per cent of the unit were foreign volunteers. He also wrote that these men were from 38 different nationalities. The RLI was a key element of Rhodesia's strategic reserve, and was frequently deployed against guerrilla forces. Other volunteers were posted to a range of units, including protection companies mainly made up of black soldiers and the largely white Grey's Scouts and Rhodesian Armoured Corps. Most of the volunteers served under Rhodesian officers. Those who were combat veterans resented being placed under the command of younger and less experienced Rhodesians.

The volunteers typically found conditions in Rhodesia to be tough, and those who had joined up due to a belief that they would enjoy a good lifestyle were rapidly disappointed. Many of the volunteers were frustrated that they were paid only in Rhodesian dollars, as foreign banks would not process this currency and the Rhodesian government allowed no more than R$1,500 to be converted to other currencies. The difficult conditions contributed to high desertion rates.

The large group of Frenchmen who enlisted together were used to form 7 Independent Company. This unit performed poorly and committed atrocities that included raping women during operations. Most of its members left Rhodesia after the company was withdrawn from operations to be retrained, though some settled in Rhodesia. Two of the former French volunteers who remained in Zimbabwe after the war were sentenced to death for murdering a café owner during a robbery in 1982 and were executed the next year.

Despite the Rhodesian government's claim that it did not recruit mercenaries, the British mercenary Peter McAleese was accepted into the Rhodesian Army during 1976. McAleese had previously led a group of British mercenaries in Angola, and was posted to the elite Rhodesian Special Air Service (SAS) after completing training. The Guardian reported in 1979 that "his presence is a source of embarrassment to the regime which has always insisted that it does not want foreign mercenaries".

Ware and Campbell wrote in 2022 that the foreign volunteers had little influence on the war, and the pressure from western governments on the Rhodesian government to agree to a transition to majority rule was of greater importance. They observed that the volunteers "failed in their efforts to protect the white regime, but not before they supported and contributed to a conflict that lasted fifteen years and claimed tens of thousands of lives".

Rhodesian responses
Despite its need for foreign volunteers, the Rhodesian government was uncomfortable with them. There were concerns that many of the volunteers were motivated more by a desire to fight in a war than a commitment to Rhodesia. The need for non-Rhodesians to sustain the country's independence was also considered problematic. The Rhodesian military rarely discussed the foreign volunteers with journalists.

The Rhodesian Army regarded the volunteers as disloyal and undisciplined. Foreign volunteers typically received a hostile reception from their Rhodesian comrades, which contributed to many leaving before the end of their contract. The desertion rate among foreigners serving in the SAS was particularly high.

American and Australian volunteers who had fought in the Vietnam War were generally well regarded by Rhodesian soldiers, and were often posted to the elite SAS and Selous Scouts. These volunteers may have further encouraged the Rhodesian Security Forces use of the 'body count' of guerrillas killed as a measure of success, with this having been a key metric in Vietnam. The Rhodesian military also adopted some of the terminology used by Americans in Vietnam, such as referring to guerrillas as 'gooks' and labelling one of their supply lines the 'Ho Chi Minh trail'. It is not known how many Vietnam veterans fought in Rhodesia.

The Canadian spree killer Mathew Lamb was able to join the Rhodesian Army in 1974 after being released from a mental institution. He had previously attempted to enlist in the Israel Defense Forces, but was rejected. The Rhodesian Army only learnt of Lamb's history after his death during an operation in 1976. The revelations about Lamb's history embarrassed the Army and led to concerns in Rhodesia about the quality of the foreign volunteers.

Nationalist and foreign responses

Nationalists
The nationalist groups that were fighting the Rhodesian regime and many progressive groups worldwide considered the volunteers to be mercenaries. White notes that this was "not because of how they were paid for fighting but because of why they were fighting", with it being argued that the volunteers had involved themselves in a war that was not theirs. Opponents of the regime frequently highlighted the issue of 'mercenaries' fighting for Rhodesia, and claimed that they were often mentally unstable and had little regard for civilian casualties. Rhodesia attempted to counter the "mercenary" claim by processing the volunteers through the Department of Immigration and framing them as prospective Rhodesian citizens, though few ever applied for citizenship.

The nationalists argued in their propaganda that the Rhodesian regime's need for foreign volunteers illustrated its political and military weaknesses. Both the main nationalist groups believed that the volunteers' presence indicated that western governments supported the Rhodesian regime. The ZAPU argued that the failure of the British and US governments to stop the flow of volunteers was a barrier to reaching a negotiated settlement with the Rhodesian government, and demanded in 1977 that this be halted. Many Africans believed that the inaction of the western governments demonstrated their lack of commitment to combating white minority rule in Rhodesia and South Africa.

British government
The British government was opposed to its citizens fighting for Rhodesia. The sanctions it imposed following UDI banned efforts to entice British citizens to live or work in Rhodesia. British citizens were prohibited from joining the Rhodesian Security Forces under the terms of an embargo enacted in 1968, with those who did so potentially facing fines or imprisonment. The prohibition proved difficult to enforce, as it was not possible to prevent Britons leaving the country. It was also unclear whether serving in the Rhodesian military was illegal under laws that prohibited service in foreign militaries as the British did not recognise Rhodesia's independence. Various approaches were considered to develop legislation to ban recruitment by the Rhodesian Security Forces during the late 1970s, but none eventuated. The FCO advised anyone who sought information about fighting for Rhodesia that doing so was illegal, but did not explain why. The British military did not take up a suggestion by the FCO that it warn servicemen against enlisting with the Rhodesian Security Forces on the grounds that serving as a mercenary was not actually illegal. The military took steps to prevent material encouraging enlistment with Rhodesia from being circulated in its bases and service newspapers, however.

In 1977 the British government provided a tentative response to an American proposal that the United Nations Security Council adopt a resolution requiring UN members to prevent their citizens from serving in the Rhodesian military. The British noted that such a resolution might prove impractical as many Rhodesians held dual citizenship. Due to the difficulty of drafting legislation that could effectively ban Britons from serving with Rhodesia or enforcing the measures that were brought in, there is no record of any British citizens being punished for serving with the Rhodesian Security Forces during the war. Those who did so received amnesties as part of the British government measures associated to end of the conflict. The historian Hugh Patterson noted that the relatively small numbers of volunteers from the UK indicates that "however vocal the support for Rhodesia by some on the political right, very few men were actually willing to put their futures on the line for the Smith [Rhodesian prime minister Ian Smith] regime".

Other foreign governments
The United States' Neutrality Act of 1794 prohibits American citizens from enlisting with foreign militaries or working as mercenaries for other governments. This law can only be enforced within the United States, meaning that American citizens who enlisted to fight for Rhodesia while overseas could not be prosecuted. The United States government did little to slow the flow of volunteers to Rhodesia. There is evidence that the Departments of Justice and State tacitly encouraged Americans to volunteer for Rhodesia as part of efforts to prevent the country collapsing before a negotiated solution to the war could be finalised. The Carter administration considered taking steps to stop Americans serving in Rhodesia, but this did not result in any policy changes. The activities of Americans in Rhodesia were widely publicised in the United States, leading to protests. The American volunteers were generally regarded in the United States as mercenaries. Many of the Americans wrongly believed that their government opposed their presence in Rhodesia, with articles in Soldier of Fortune and works by the author Robin Moore also claiming this.

The legality of volunteering for the Rhodesian Security Forces varied between other countries. Doing so was illegal under laws banning mercenary activity in Israel, West Germany, Switzerland and the Netherlands. The Australian parliament passed legislation banning Australians from serving with Rhodesia in 1978. The Portuguese government banned Rhodesian recruitment in the late 1970s, but was unable to enforce the legislation. Canada had similar laws to the UK, and France and New Zealand were unable to prevent their citizens from travelling to Rhodesia to fight.

Removal of the volunteers
Many of the foreign volunteers opposed the March 1978 Internal Settlement, under which the white Rhodesian government agreed to cede power to moderate black leaders. These volunteers felt that Ian Smith had betrayed white Rhodesians by signing this agreement. They also feared for their lives due to a perception that a black majority government would place them on trial for murder and other crimes.

Under the terms of the 1979 Lancaster House Agreement that ended the war the British government resumed control over Rhodesia in December 1979, with the country temporarily reverting to the colony of Southern Rhodesia until elections could be held. On 21 December that year the UN Security Council adopted Resolution 460 that, among other things, called for the British authorities to expel all "mercenaries" and South African forces from Southern Rhodesia. The United Nations General Assembly had adopted a similar motion several days earlier at the behest of several countries in southern Africa. In January 1980 the British Lord Privy Seal, Ian Gilmour, stated that the British government had committed during the negotiations that led to the Lancaster House Agreement to not remove foreigners from the Rhodesian military prior to the election.

The ZANU won the February 1980 Southern Rhodesian general election. The new Prime Minister Robert Mugabe directed shortly after the election that "mercenaries" be dismissed as they were among the "irregular features of the present Army" and were "not needed". All other white military personnel, other than members of the Selous Scouts unit that had a reputation for atrocities, were given an assurance that they would not be required to leave the military.

Literature and historiography

A range of works have provided positive portrayals of the foreign volunteers. Soldier of Fortune ran large numbers of articles on foreigners in the Rhodesian Security Forces during the Bush War; each edition published between 1975 and 1980 included at least one article on the subject. These articles frequently highlighted the experiences of Americans who were fighting in Rhodesia. The articles in Soldier of Fortune reflected Rhodesian government propaganda, as they claimed that the country was a western democracy, the war was being fought against communism and did not discuss the oppression of Rhodesia's black majority. Robin Moore included profiles of twelve volunteers as part of a non-fiction book he wrote in 1976 that argued that the Rhodesian government was not racist and sanctions against it should be lifted. He also wrote the novel Crippled Eagles which was based on the experiences of American volunteers. It was finished in 1980 and published in 1991. Stephen Jeffreys' 1980 play 'The Jubilee Too' included a British volunteer who had returned from Rhodesia as one of its characters. 

Few works by historians have been published on the volunteers who served with the Rhodesian Security Forces. As of 2021, the literature largely comprises brief discussions of the topic as part of books and academic journal articles on broader issues.

Modern white supremacist and far-right groups continue to provide a positive portrayal of white rule in Rhodesia. The foreign volunteers who fought for the country are celebrated by these groups. The academic Kyle Burke has written that some anti-government paramilitary forces in the United States draw inspiration from the volunteers, and cite them as an example when encouraging violence against African Americans.

See also
List of foreign volunteers

References

Citations

Works consulted

 

Foreign volunteers in the Rhodesian Security Forces
Rhodesian Bush War
Foreign relations of Rhodesia